Kirchwerder is a quarter of Hamburg, Germany, in the borough of Bergedorf. It is located on the southeast border of Hamburg at the Elbe river.

Geography
Kirchwerder is a part of the Vierlande and is located at the Elbe river. Therefore it is highly endangered by storm floods.

Kircherwerder borders the quarters Ochsenwerder, Reitbrook and Neuengamme. In the south is Harburg in Lower Saxony. The place Fünfhausen is located in the west of Kirchwerder. Zollenspieker is at the Elbe river.

Politics
These are the results of Kirchwerder in the Hamburg state election:

Transport
Kirchwerder has no S-Bahn or U-Bahn station. However it has a large bus system.

References

Quarters of Hamburg
Bergedorf